Elspe Festival is a theatre festival in Elspe (Lennestadt), Germany.

Since 1952/1964, Karl May's adventure novels about Winnetou are put on stage. The festival became hugely popular after 1976 when Pierre Brice, a French actor known for Apache Gold and further movies adapting Karl May's novels, played Winnetou (1976–1980, 1982–1986) at Elspe. In 1980, the festival attracted 404,758 visitors. In 2019, the festival has been attracting 219,000 visitors.

Elspe Festival is not to be confused with Karl May Festival in Bad Segeberg or Karl-May-Festtage in Radebeul.

References 

 Official website (History, in German)
 Karl-May-Wiki on Elspe Festival (in German)

Theatre festivals in Germany